Death of a Corrupt Man, also known as The Twisted Detective and To Kill a Rat, is a 1977 French political thriller directed by Georges Lautner and starring Alain Delon. The film is based on the novel by Raf Vallet.

Cast
 Alain Delon as Xavier 'Xav' Maréchal
 Ornella Muti as Valérie
 Stéphane Audran as Christiane
 Mireille Darc as Françoise
 Maurice Ronet as Philippe Dubaye
 Michel Aumont as Commissaire Moreau
 Jean Bouise as Commissaire Pernais
 Daniel Ceccaldi as Lucien Lacor
 Julien Guiomar as Fondari
 Klaus Kinski as Nicolas Tomski
 François Chaumette as Lansac
 Xavier Depraz as Marcel
 Henri Virlojeux as Paul
 Colette Duval as La secrétaire de Serrano
 Carole Lange as La fille du vestiaire
 El Kebir as Kébir
 Gérard Hérold as Dupaire

Musical score and soundtrack

The film score was composed and arranged by Philippe Sarde and features saxophonist Stan Getz fronting the London Symphony Orchestra and the soundtrack album was first released on the French Melba label.

Allmusic's Yuri German noted, "Film director Georges Lautner, who worked with Philippe Sarde on a dozen films, said that he was always impressed by the composer's ability to find an original musical approach to each picture. This time, Sarde, who always closely follows the editing process, suggested that they needed a strong soloist, preferably a tenor saxophone player, who would serve as a musical counterpart for the actor Alain Delon's famous good looks. Being a perfectionist, he opted for Stan Getz, one of the all-time great tenor saxophonists. Watching Getz's performance, Lautner decided to find a way to put the musician in the picture. He filmed Getz playing the opening theme, "Paris, Cinq Heures du Matin", solo, and it's the saxophonist's silhouette that appears during the credits sequence in the beginning of the film... The soundtrack turned out to be costly, but the director was pleased with the outcome. Sarde's instincts were right—Getz's saxophone gave the soundtrack a lyrical, nostalgic quality—fitting for Alain Delon's quest in the film for the sake of the past, to honor the memory of his dead friend".

Track listing
All compositions by Philippe Sarde.

 "Paris, 5 H Du Matin" - 2:38
 "Souvenirs" - 2:05
 "Valérie" - 1:35
 "Les Camions" - 1:30
 "L'Attente" - 1:17
 "Getz O Mania" - 3:07
 "Mort d'un Pourri" - 5:30
 "Montparnasse" - 3:37
 "Cafeteria" - 1:23
 "Les Aveux" - 1:08
 "Rocquencourt" - 1:50
 "Tout est Tranquille" - 1:50

Personnel
Stan Getz - tenor saxophone
Andy LaVerne - piano
Marcel Azzola - bandoneon
Rick Laird - bass 
Billy Hart  - drums
Efrain Toro - percussion
London Symphony Orchestra conducted by Carlo Savina

References

External links

1977 films
1977 crime films
1970s French-language films
French crime films
Films directed by Georges Lautner
Films produced by Alain Delon
Films with screenplays by Michel Audiard
Films scored by Philippe Sarde
1970s French films